The 2021 NCAA Division I softball tournament was held from May 21 through June 10, 2021 as the final part of the 2021 NCAA Division I softball season. 31 teams were awarded automatic bids as champions of their conferences after the Ivy League opted out of the 2021 softball season. The remaining 33 were selected at-large by the NCAA Division I softball selection committee on May 16, 2021. The tournament culminated with eight teams playing in the 2021 Women's College World Series at USA Softball Hall of Fame Stadium in Oklahoma City.

Bids

Automatic bids
The Big Ten, Big West, Mountain West, Pac-12, and West Coast Conference bids were awarded to the regular-season champion. All other conferences had their automatic bid go to the conference tournament winner.

At-large

By conference

National seeds
16 National Seeds were announced on the Selection Show, on Sunday, May 16 at 9 p.m. EDT on ESPN2. 15 of the 16 national seeds hosted Regionals. Teams in italics advanced to Super Regionals. Teams in bold advanced to the Women's College World Series.

1. Oklahoma

2. 

3. Alabama

4. 

5. 

6. Arkansas

7. 

8. 

9. 

10. 

11. 

12. Texas

13.  (not a host)

14. 

15. 

16.

Regionals and Super Regionals
The Regionals took place May 20–23. The Super Regionals took place May 27–30.

Norman Super Regional

Columbia Super Regional

Stillwater Super Regional

Gainesville Super Regional

Tuscaloosa Super Regional

Fayetteville Super Regional

Baton Rouge Super Regional

Los Angeles Super Regional

Women's College World Series
The Women's College World Series was held June 3 through June 10 in Oklahoma City.

Participants

† = From NCAA Division I Softball Championship Results

Bracket

Championship game

All-tournament Team
The following players were members of the Women's College World Series All-Tournament Team.

Game results

Record by conference

The columns RF, SR, WS, NS, F, and NC respectively stand for the Regional Finals, Super Regionals, College World Series Teams, National Semi-Finals, Finals, and National Champion.

Media coverage

Radio
For the first time ever Westwood One will provide nationwide radio coverage of every game in the Women's College World Series. It was streamed online at westwoodsports.com, through TuneIn, and on SiriusXM. Ryan Radtke and Leah Amico return as the broadcast team.

Television
ESPN held exclusive rights to the tournament. The network aired games across ESPN, ESPN2, ESPNU, SEC Network, Longhorn Network, ACC Network and ESPN3. For just the fourth time in the history of the women's softball tournament, ESPN covered every regional. ABC will air a super regional game for the first time in tournament history.

Broadcast assignments

Regionals
Norman: Courtney Lyle & Kayla Braud
Los Angeles: Mark Neely & Kenzie Fowler
Tuscaloosa: Eric Frede & Madison Shipman
Gainesville: Beth Mowins & Michele Smith
Stillwater: Clay Matvick & Natasha Watley
Fayetteville: Mike Corey & Leah Amico
Baton Rouge: Alex Loeb & Megan Willis
Columbia: Tyler Denning & Tori Vidales
Super Regionals
Norman: Beth Mowins, Jessica Mendoza, Michele Smith & Holly Rowe
Columbia: Mike Couzens & Carol Bruggeman
Stillwater: Tiffany Greene & Erin Miller
Gainesville: Courtney Lyle & Kayla Braud
Women's College World Series
Kevin Brown, Amanda Scarborough & Jalyn Johnson (afternoons, early Fri)
Beth Mowins, Jessica Mendoza, Michele Smith & Holly Rowe (evenings minus early Fri)

Regionals
Knoxville: Tiffany Greene & Erin Miller
Tallahassee: Jenn Hildreth & Brittany McKinney
Tucson: Jonathan Yardley & Amanda Freed
Austin: Kevin Brown, Amanda Scarborough & Jalyn Johnson
Athens: Alex Perlman & Francesca Enea
Lexington: Mike Couzens & Carol Bruggeman
Tempe: John Schriffen & Jennie Ritter
Seattle: Pam Ward & Jenny Dalton-Hill
Super Regionals
Tuscaloosa: Eric Frede & Madison Shipman
Fayetteville: Pam Ward & Jenny Dalton Hill
Baton Rouge: Kevin Brown, Amanda Scarborough & Jalyn Johnson
Los Angeles: Mark Neely & Kenzie Fowler
Women's College World Series Finals
Beth Mowins, Jessica Mendoza, Michele Smith & Holly Rowe

References

NCAA Division I softball tournament
Tournament